The AZ Tower is a high rise building in the city of Brno, Czech Republic. It is currently the tallest building in the Czech Republic. Construction of the building commenced in 2011 and completed in April 2013. It is utilized for office, retail and residential purposes.

The AZ Tower is located on Pražákova street in the city district Brno-center. M-Palace and Spielberk Towers are located near the building. The Spielberk Tower B used to be the tallest building in Brno until the AZ tower was built.

Gallery

References

External links 
 AZ Tower website
 
 

Buildings and structures in Brno
Skyscraper office buildings in the Czech Republic
Skyscraper hotels
Residential skyscrapers
Skyscrapers in the Czech Republic
Commercial buildings completed in 2013
Office buildings completed in 2013
2013 establishments in the Czech Republic
21st-century architecture in the Czech Republic